Alvaro Zalla (born 22 December 1973) is an Albanian former footballer who played as a midfielder. He made six appearances for the Albania national team from 1993 to 1996.

References

External links
 

1973 births
Living people
Sportspeople from Durrës
Albanian footballers
Association football midfielders
Albania international footballers
KF Teuta Durrës players
SV Wehen Wiesbaden players
Viktoria Aschaffenburg players
Eintracht Nordhorn players
SV Meppen players
FC Oberneuland players
Albanian expatriate footballers
Albanian expatriate sportspeople in Germany
Expatriate footballers in Germany